The 2018 Wales Rally GB (formally known as the 74. Dayinsure Wales Rally GB) was a motor racing event for rally cars that took place over four days between 4 and 7 October 2018. The event was open to entries competing in World Rally Cars and cars complying with Group R regulations. It marked the seventy-fourth running of Rally Great Britain and was the eleventh round of the 2018 FIA World Rally Championship, the highest class of competition in international rallying. Sixty crews, including manufacturer teams and privateers, were entered to compete in the World Rally Championship, the FIA World Rally Championship-2 and FIA World Rally Championship-3 support series and the MSA British Rally Championship. The 2018 event was based in Deeside in Flintshire and consisted of twenty-three special stages throughout North and Mid-Wales.

The M-Sport Ford World Rally Team crew of Elfyn Evans and Daniel Barritt were the defending rally winners. Pontus Tidemand and Jonas Andersson of Škoda Motorsport were the defending winners of the World Rally Championship-2, and French privateers Raphaël Astier and Frédéric Vauclare were the reigning winners in the World Rally Championship-3 category; however, Astier and Vauclare did not defend their title as they did not enter the rally.

The rally was won by Sébastien Ogier and Julien Ingrassia. The result marked their fifth win in Wales and saw them become the most successful crew in the history of the event. Ogier and Ingrassia moved to within seven points of championship leaders Thierry Neuville and Nicolas Gilsoul. Toyota's Jari-Matti Latvala and Miikka Anttila finished second, with their teammates Esapekka Lappi and Janne Ferm completing the podium. M-Sport Ford World Rally Team were the manufacturers' winners, whilst Toyota Gazoo Racing WRT extended their lead in the manufacturers' championship. The Škoda Motorsport II crew of Kalle Rovanperä and Jonne Halttunen won in the World Rally Championship-2 in a Škoda Fabia R5, while the local crew of Tom Williams and Phil Hall won in the World Rally Championship-3.

Background

Championship standings prior to the event

Thierry Neuville and Nicolas Gilsoul entered the round as the leaders of the World Rally Championship for Drivers and the World Rally Championship for Co-Drivers respectively. They held a thirteen-point lead over Ott Tänak and Martin Järveoja. Defending World Champions Sébastien Ogier and Julien Ingrassia were third, a further ten points behind. In the World Rally Championship for Manufacturers, Toyota Gazoo Racing WRT held a five-point lead over Hyundai Shell Mobis WRT.

In the World Rally Championship-2 standings, Jan Kopecký and Pavel Dresler led the drivers' and co-drivers' standings by thirty-two points, but did not contest the rally. Pontus Tidemand and Jonas Andersson were in second place, thirty-eight points ahead of privateers Gus Greensmith and Craig Parry. Škoda Motorsport II held a seventeen-point lead over sister team Škoda Motorsport in the teams' championship.

Newly crowned Junior World Rally Champion Emil Bergkvist led the World Rally Championship-3 drivers' standings. Denis Rådström was second, six points behind Bergkvist and Jean-Baptiste Franceschi third; Franceschi entered the rally, but did not nominate it as a round to score points. Johan Johansson held a one-point lead over Romain Courbon in the co-drivers' standings, while Tatu Hämäläinen was another eleven points behind. In the teams' championship, ACI Team Italia led Castrol Ford Team Turkiye by sixteen points.

Entry list
The following crews were entered into the rally. The entry list consisted of sixty crews, including eleven World Rally Car entries, fourteen entries in the World Rally Championship-2, four in the World Rally Championship-3 and nineteen in the British national championship.

Calendar changes
The event swapped places on the calendar with the Rally Catalunya de España. Where the 2017 rally was run as the penultimate round of the championship, the 2018 event was brought forward from the last week of October to the first week in the expectation of better weather conditions for the event. Toyota driver Jari-Matti Latvala anticipated that the change would see the rally run with stable, more-predictable temperatures than in previous years, making it easier to set the car up for the prevailing conditions. Further changes to the calendar saw the revival of Rally Turkey as a replacement for Rally Poland. The Turkish event was named as the tenth round of the championship and in light of the distance crews needed to travel from Turkey to Wales, the Fédération Internationale de l'Automobile (FIA)—the governing body of international motorsport—gave entrants an additional week to prepare for Rally GB compared to previous years.

Route
The 2018 event featured a heavily revised route from the 2017 rally. The route for the 2018 event was designed to be more challenging than the routes used in previous years. The changes were introduced in response to criticism from crews and teams over the lengthy transport route, or the route taken on public roads to travel between special stages. The final route featured an additional  in competitive kilometres compared to the 2017 route and the transport distance was shortened. The changes to the route allowed the crews to return to the service park in Deeside at the end of the first day of competition as the omission of the return to the service park had been one of the teams' criticisms of the 2017 event.

Details
The rally was made up of gravel roads through forests and moors. Many of these roads received little commercial traffic through the year aside from forestry maintenance and logging projects. Unlike events such as Rally Italia Sardegna and Rally Australia where loose gravel on the road surface creates dust, the road surface in Wales is made up of heavier gravel on a hard-packed road base. This creates more grip for crews in the dry, but the roads can become muddy and rutted in wet weather, particularly when a stage is used multiple times.

The event featured two days in northern Wales and one day in the middle of the country. It then moved into the forests of Conwy and Gwynedd on 5 October and was made up of two passes over Clocaenog Forest, Penmachno Forest and a new stage formed by merging the Brenig reservoir stage—which was run as the Power Stage between 2014 and 2017—with the Alwen stage using parts of the B4501 to connect them. Penmachno Forest was run in its full length by using public roads. The Cholmondeley Castle spectator stage in England was removed and replaced by a new spectator stage called Slate Mountain. The rally moved to Powys and Ceredigion on 6 October for the longest day of the rally, totalling  competitive kilometres. It consisted of two passes over the Myherin, Hafren, Dyfi and Gartheiniog stages and a single running of Dyfnant. The Hafren stage was extended to include the Sweet Lamb spectator arena. The 2018 event marked the first time since 1997 that these five stages were run on the same day. The rally returned to northern Wales on 7 October and the forests of Conwy and Snowdonia. The Gwydir stage was doubled in length from previous years before the rally concludes with two passes over a spectator stage around the Great Orme headland and the streets of Llandudno. A shortened version of the Great Orme stage had previously been used in 2011 when it was run in the opposite direction.

Organisers of the event had a dispute with the Fédération Internationale de l'Automobile (FIA) over the planned route. The original proposal featured the Great Orme stage—which had previously featured in the route of the 2013 event—as the event's Power Stage. However, the FIA rejected the route as the proposed stage was not representative of the rally; the route primarily consisted of gravel stages, but the proposed stage was tarmac. The dispute was resolved when the organisers agreed to run the first pass over Gwydir as the Power Stage, allowing the event to finish in Llandudno as originally planned.

The inclusion of public roads in the route was made possible with the passage of the Deregulation Act 2015 by the British government, which amended parts of the Road Traffic Act 1988 to make it possible for events to close public roads to be used for motor racing events in the United Kingdom. In February 2018, the National Assembly for Wales passed the Road Traffic Act 1988 (Motor Racing) (Wales) Regulations 2018, a piece of secondary legislation that enabled motor racing events to take place on public roads in Wales.

Itinerary

Reception
The new route was received positively by drivers—particularly former Citroën driver Kris Meeke—who appreciated the inclusion of challenging stages. Thierry Neuville and Craig Breen also applauded the route as the best route used by the rally since it moved from Cardiff to Deeside. Defending rally winner Elfyn Evans had a more muted response, expressing disappointment that organisers had not taken full advantage of road closures to create a more demanding route, such as merging the Dyfi and Gartheiniog stages. Rally organisers revealed that they had considered many of the suggestions Evans had raised, but chose a more conservative approach to road closures as the legislation that allowed them to close roads had only been passed in February 2018 and they wanted to ensure that the protocol had been followed properly.

Report

Leg 1
Esapekka Lappi and Janne Ferm completed the opening super special stage three tenths of a second ahead of fellow Toyota crew Jari-Matti Latvala and Miikka Anttila and championship leaders Thierry Neuville and Nicolas Gilsoul, who tied for second. As the event moved into the forest stages, Ott Tänak and Martin Järveoja—who entered the rally having taken three consecutive victories—dominanted the early running. He won five of the eight stages and established a comfortable lead to end the day twenty-eight seconds ahead of Neuville and Gilsoul. Tänak had been closely matched by defending rally winners Elfyn Evans and Daniel Barritt until their Fiesta WRC developed a misfire and was forced to retire from the leg. Latvala and Anttila dropped down to third overall after losing their rhythm in the afternoon loop. Lappi and Ferm recovered from an early spin to finish fourth, while Sébastien Ogier and Julien Ingrassia completed the leg in fifth. Ogier and Ingrassia had fallen to eighth during the first pass over the stages when they suffered a series of spins and the loss of first and second gear. Their M-Sport Ford teammates Teemu Suninen and Mikko Markkula completed the team's woes when they slid off the road and into a ditch; Suninen and Markkula were unable to re-enter the rally. Craig Breen and Scott Martin were the lead Citroën crew in sixth after enjoying a trouble-free day, ahead of Hyundai crews led Hayden Paddon and Sebastian Marshall in seventh and Andreas Mikkelsen and Anders Jæger-Synnevaag in eighth. Both Paddon and Mikkelsen complained of unpredictable handling in their cars, particularly during the afternoon loop of stages when rain affected the profile of the roads. Neuville, by comparison, reported that his car's handling improved in the afternoon, benefiting from a new specification of tyre provided by Michelin that offered improved grip whilst being more durable than previous tyres. Citroën's Mads Østberg and Torstein Eriksen were the last of the drivers in a World Rally Car-specification entry, finishing the leg in ninth place.

Leg 2
Ott Tänak and Martin Järveoja continued their form through the opening stages of the second leg until they were forced to retire. Tänak damaged his radiator after a heavy landing off a jump during the second pass through Sweet Lamb Hafren. Tänak and Järveoja had experienced similar retirements in the Rallies of Portugal and Sardinia. Ogier and Ingrassia experienced a resurgence, climbing from fifth place to take the lead; however, Ogier chose the more-durable medium compound tyres as the dry gravel would damage the faster soft compound, and was unable to build a lead of his own. He finished the leg with a slender four-second advantage over the surviving Toyotas of Jari-Matti Latvala and Miikka Anttila in second place and Esapekka Lappi and Janne Ferm in third. Craig Breen and Scott Martin ended the leg in fourth, some fifteen seconds off the lead. The reversal of the running order for the second leg meant that Mads Østberg and Torstein Eriksen ran with favourable road conditions, which allowed them to find some pace in the morning loop and climb the leaderboard. Andreas Mikkelsen and Anders Jæger-Synnevaag similarly benefited from their road position, winning three of the day's stages and finishing the leg two and a half seconds behind Østberg and Eriksen. Hayden Paddon and Sebastian Marshall completed the day in seventh overall ahead of Thierry Neuville and Nicolas Gilsoul; Neuville and Gilsoul had been running second at the time, but lost fifty-one seconds when they ran off the road in the early morning stages and he conceded a further fifteen seconds to Ogier and Ingrassia when they was unable to match the leaders' pace.

Leg 3
The final leg of the rally saw Ogier and Ingrassia trade places with Latvala and Anttila several times. Ogier and Ingrassia initially held the advantage, but a fast time by Latvala and Anttila through the Gwydir Power Stage—that saw them take the five bonus points—was enough to seize the lead. Latvala and Anttila held the lead through the first pass over Great Orme Llandudno, only for Ogier and Ingrassia to reclaim it on the return to Gwydir. The final stage was delayed following an incident that required the attention of emergency services and not all of the competitors were able to start the stage. Latvala and Anttila was unable to set a competitive time, meaning Ogier and Ingrassia only needed to finish to claim victory. They ultimately set a time fast enough to win the stage and the rally, taking twenty-five World Championship points for the win and an additional three points for third place on the Power Stage. Esapekka Lappi and Janne Ferm completed the podium and scored an extra Power Stage point. Craig Breen and Scott Martin were fourth, ahead of Neuville and Gilsoul. Neuville and Gilsoul led the three Hyundais, with Mikkelsen and Jæger-Synnevaag in sixth and Paddon and Marshall seventh. Mads Østberg and Torstein Eriksen were eighth, with the final points-scoring places going to World Rally Championship-2 entrants Kalle Rovanperä and Jonne Halttunen and their Škoda Motorsport teammates Pontus Tidemand and Jonas Andersson. Ott Tänak and Martin Järveoja re-entered under Rally2 regulations and finished nineteenth overall, scoring four points on the Power Stage in the process. Elfyn Evans and Daniel Barritt also re-entered and finished twentieth in the final classification.

Support categories
In the World Rally Championship-2 standings, eighteen year-old Kalle Rovanperä and co-driver Jonne Halttunen finished the first leg as the category leader and tenth in the overall standings. Rovanperä and Halttunen won every stage but one to establish a lead of fifty-five seconds over teammates Pontus Tidemand and Jonas Andersson, while British privateers Gus Greensmith and Alessandro Gelsomino finished the leg in third. Rovanperä and Halttunen maintained their lead over Tidemand and Andersson throughout the second leg and the two crews climbed to ninth and tenth in the overall classification following the retirement of Tänak and Järveoja. Rovanperä and Halttunen went on to win the category by ninety-four seconds, aided by an off-road excursion by Tidemand and Andersson in the Power Stage. Tidemand and Andersson damaged their rear suspension, but were able to continue after repairing the damage during a transport stage. The result was Rovanperä and Haltunnen's second win in the category. Tidemand and Andersson recovered to finish second, with Greensmith and Gelsomino finishing third.

Tom Williams and Phil Hall led the first leg in the World Rally Championship-3 category after trading stage wins with Taisko Lario and Tatu Hämäläinen throughout the day. Williams and Hall's lead was consolidated during the second leg when Lario and Hämäläinen were late checking into a stage and had thirty seconds added to his time as a penalty. Williams and Hall went on to win the event, marking their first victory in the category. Italian privateers Enrico Brazzoli and Luca Beltrame caught and passed Lario and Hämäläinen during the second leg and held the position until the end of the rally. Lario and Hämäläinen ultimately finished third overall.

The first two legs of the rally also served as the final two rounds of the MSA British Rally Championship. M-Sport driver Matt Edwards and co-driver Darren Garrod secured the 2018 championship title with fourth place on the first leg of the rally. Edwards and Garrod won the second leg and were the highest-place national entrant at the end of the rally.

Classification

Final results

Special stages

Power stage
The Power stage was a 14.70 km stage run on the final day of the rally. Additional World Drivers' and Co-drivers' Championship points were awarded to the five fastest crews. As the Power Stage was not the final stage of the rally, crews had to complete the event to be eligible to receive the points.

Penalties
The following crews were given time penalties during the rally.

Retirements
The following crews retired from the event. Under Rally2 regulations, they were eligible to re-enter the event starting from the next leg. Crews that re-entered were given an additional time penalty.

Championship standings after the rally

Drivers' championships

Co-Drivers' championships

Manufacturers' and teams' championships

Notes

References

External links

  
 2018 Wales Rally GB in e-wrc website
 The official website of the World Rally Championship
 The official website of Dayinsure sponsor

2018 World Rally Championship season
2018
2018 in British motorsport
October 2018 sports events in the United Kingdom